The Order of Mubarak the Great (Wisam Mubarak al-Kabir) is a knighthood order of Kuwait.

History
The Order was founded on 16 July 1974 by the national government to celebrate the memory of Mubarak Al-Sabah called the Great, Sheikh of Kuwait from 1896 to 1915, who succeeded in 1897 in obtaining an independence recognition from the  Ottoman Empire in favour of Kuwait.

Recipients 
The Order is awarded to Heads of State and foreign Sovereigns and to members of foreign royal families in sign of friendship.

 Hussein of Jordan (1974)
 Soeharto (1977)
 Elizabeth II (1979)
 Jigme Singye Wangchuck (1990)
 George H. W. Bush (1993)
 Charles, Prince of Wales (1993)
 Bill Clinton (1994)
 Naruhito, then Crown Prince of Japan (1995)
 Mahathir Mohamad (1997)
 Émile Lahoud (2000)
 Abdullah of Saudi Arabia (2000)
 Mohammed VI of Morocco (2002)
 Hamad bin Isa Al Khalifa (2004)
 Michel Suleiman (2009)
 Nicolas Sarkozy (2009)
 Ilham Aliyev (2009)
 Qaboos bin Said al Said (2009)
 Bashar al-Assad (2010)
 Giorgio Napolitano (2010)
 Tamim bin Hamad Al Thani (2013)
 Salman of Saudi Arabia (2016)
 Kolinda Grabar-Kitarović (2017)

Insignia
The collar of the Order is composed of a golden medallion with a decorative ring with floral motifs, with a central medallion showing a sailboat (one of, the national emblems of the state). The body of the collar is alternating with squares of blue enamel bearing a sailboat and a 10-pointed star in white enamel bearing in the center the monogram  of Kuwait.

The ribbon of Grand Cordon is navy blue with white stripes on each side.

Grades
 Collar (Qiladat al-Mubarak al-Kabir) to Heads of State
 Grand Cordon (Qashah al-Mubarak al-Kabir) to foreign Heirs Apparent and senior Princes

External links
 World Medals Index, Kuwait: Order of Mubarak the Great

Orders, decorations, and medals of Kuwait
Mubarak the Great, Order of
Awards established in 1974